Kay Copland is a Scottish sport shooter.

Copland competed at the 2010 Commonwealth Games winning a gold medal in the 50m prone pairs event and a bronze medal in the 50m three positions pairs event, both alongside Jennifer McIntosh.

References

Year of birth missing (living people)
Living people
Scottish female sport shooters
Shooters at the 2010 Commonwealth Games
Commonwealth Games gold medallists for Scotland
Commonwealth Games bronze medallists for Scotland
Commonwealth Games medallists in shooting
British female sport shooters
Medallists at the 2010 Commonwealth Games